Time of Desires is a 1984 Soviet drama film directed by Yuli Raizman, the last in his filmography.

Plot
An energetic, modern woman, she believes that with the help of connections and sober calculation everything can be achieved: well-being, respectability, even personal happiness. She does not notice that the fulfillment of her desires does not at all make a person close to her happy. Payback is unexpected and terrible.

Cast
 Vera Alentova as Svetlana
 Anatoly Papanov as  Vladimir
 Vladislav Strzhelchik as Nikolay Nikolayevich, a composer
 Tatyana Yegorova as Mila
 Boris Ivanov as 	Andrey Sergeyevich

Awards
Awarded Vasilyev Brothers State Prize of the RSFSR.

References

External links
 
  Time of Desires at the KinoPoisk

Mosfilm films
Soviet drama films
1984 drama films
1984 films